The name Palomino Club may refer to:

 Palomino Club (Las Vegas), a strip club founded in the 1960s
 Palomino Club (North Hollywood), an influential performance venue in Los Angeles that closed in 1995